Copal is a type of resin.  

Copal may also refer to:

 Bursera glabrifolia, a tree commonly used in woodcarving
 Bursera bipinnata, another species of Bursera, also used in woodcarving
 Nidec Copal Corporation, a Japanese photographic, electronic, optical and mechanical manufacturer

See also
Copal tree (disambiguation)